Kimberley is a rural area in the Selwyn District of the South Island of New Zealand. It consists of an old hall, a cemetery and arable and sheep farming land. 

A magnitude 7.1 earthquake occurred south of Kimberley at 4:35 am on 4 September 2010, causing widespread damage to buildings in the districts of Selwyn, Christchurch and Waimakariri.

References

Selwyn District
Populated places in Canterbury, New Zealand